The Year of the Rabbit is a 1987  Argentine comedy drama film directed by Fernando Ayala and written by Oscar Viale.

The film starred Gerardo Romano.

Main cast
 Luisina Brando
 Federico Luppi
 Gerardo Romano
 Ulises Dumont
 Juan Carlos Dual
 Ludovica Squirru
 Katja Alemán
 Andrea Barbieri
 Raúl Rizzo
 Emilio Vidal

Other cast
 Luis Alday
 Martín Andrade
 Olga Bruno
 Ana María Colombo
 Adrián Cuneo
 Manuel Cuneo
 Cristina Czetto
 Sandra Domínguez
 Héctor Ezcurra
 Daniel Galarza
 Maruja Pibernat
 Nilda Raggi
 Felisa Rocha
 Enrique Sabattini
 Carlos Santamaría
 Carlos Silva
 Alejandra Sirlin
 Jorge Varas
 Hebe Castro Zinny

Release and acclaim
The film premiered on 13 August 1987.

External links
 

1987 films
1987 comedy-drama films
Argentine comedy-drama films
1980s Spanish-language films
Films directed by Fernando Ayala
1980s Argentine films